Wietse Veenstra (born 18 February 1946) is a Dutch footballer who played as a midfielder. He made nine appearances for the Netherlands national team from 1968 to 1970.

References

External links
 

1946 births
Living people
People from Oldambt (municipality)
Dutch footballers
Footballers from Groningen (province)
Association football midfielders
Netherlands international footballers
Eredivisie players
Belgian Pro League players
Challenger Pro League players
Go Ahead Eagles players
PSV Eindhoven players
Club Brugge KV players
Cercle Brugge K.S.V. players
R.W.D. Molenbeek players
Dutch expatriate footballers
Dutch expatriate sportspeople in Belgium
Expatriate footballers in Belgium